Diodora fontainiana is a species of sea snail, a marine gastropod mollusk in the family Fissurellidae, the keyhole limpets and slit limpets.

Distribution
This species occurs in the Pacific Ocean off Peru.

References

External links
 To World Register of Marine Species

Fissurellidae
Gastropods described in 1841